HOV1 (pronounced Hovet) are a Swedish hip hop group formed in 2015 signed to EMI Sweden / Universal Music Sweden. The group has released four studio albums; Hov1, Gudarna på Västerbron, Vindar på Mars, Barn av vår tid, and one mixtape Montague. They all charted atop the Swedish Albums Chart. The group have had 26 top 10 hits on the Swedish Singles Chart, with 12 of them reaching the top spot.

History

2015–2018: First releases and projects 
Made up of Ludwig Kronstrand, Noel Flike, Dante Lindhe and Axel Liljefors Jansson, Hov1's debut hit single was "Hur kan du säga saker", which was released in 2015. They released their self-titled debut album Hov1 in April 2017, promoting it with the "Abbey Road Tour". The follow-up album was Gudarna på Västerbron, released in April 2018. Both albums have topped the Swedish Albums Chart.

2019–present: Vindar på Mars and mixtape Montague
On 17 May 2019, the band released their third studio album, Vindar på Mars. Furthermore, on 10 January 2020, Hov1 released their fourth studio album (also described as a mixtape), called Montague. Both of these releases debuted at number one the Swedish Albums Chart. They also charted on the Finnish Albums Chart, peaking at number 25 and 40, respectively. According to Swedish newspaper Svenska Dagbladet, the group will release another album in the summer of 2020, which reportedly will contain more pop than previous releases as well as more inspiration from film music. A release date for the album has not yet been revealed, but it will reportedly contain nine tracks.

Awards 
HOV1 has received several awards during its career. The group received three Rockbjörnen awards in 2018, as well as in 2019. The awards were, for instance, "Live-group of the year", "Best fans of the year" and "Concert of the year". The group also received three awards in the "P3 Guld gala" in 2019; "Group of the year", "Guldmicken" and "Best song of the year", the latter with the song "Hon dansar vidare i livet".

Members

Dante Lindhe
Dante Sebastian Lindhe is born on 10 January 1996 in Gothenburg. He is a Swedish musician and model. His family moved to Stockholm when he was 3 years old. Besides membership in Hov1, Lindhe collaborated with Yasin on the 2020 track "Canada Goose". Since 2019, Lindhe has modelled for Select Model Stockholm.

Ludwig Kronstrand
He is born on 29 June 1997. He previously dated singer Zara Larsson, a high school friend. She wrote the song "Never Forget You" about him. The two parted when Larsson moved to the States in 2014.

Axel Liljefors Jansson
He is born on 29 August 1997. He uses the name "Jiggy" in the band. He is the band's producer.

Noel Flike
Rapper Noel Flike is born on 13 May 1997 in Stockholm. Besides his membership in Hov1, he has worked with singer Zara Larsson on her podcast in 2015 and 2016.

Discography

Albums

Singles

Other charted songs

References

External links
Facebook

Swedish hip hop groups
Swedish-language singers
Musical groups established in 2015
Musical groups from Stockholm
Universal Music Group artists
2015 establishments in Sweden